Kora Kagaz ( translation: Blank Paper) is a 1974 Indian Hindi-language drama film produced by Sanath Kothari and directed by Anil Ganguly. The film stars Vijay Anand, Jaya Bhaduri, A.K. Hangal, Achala Sachdev and Deven Verma. The film's music is by Kalyanji Anandji. The famous title song "Mera Jeevan Kora Kagaz" (loosely translated as: "My life is a blank paper") was rendered by Kishore Kumar.

At the 22nd National Film Awards, it won the award for Best Popular Film Providing Wholesome Entertainment, while Lata Mangeshkar won the award for Best Female Playback Singer.

The film is a remake of 1963 Bengali film Saat Pake Bandha directed by Ajoy Kar, and starring Suchitra Sen which itself was based on the story Saat Paake Bandha by Ashutosh Mukhopadhyay

Plot
Professor Sukesh Dutt (Vijay Anand) and Archana Gupta (Jaya Bachchan) meet each other in a chance encounter while traveling by BEST bus service in Mumbai. Archana's father likes Sukesh and both Archana and Sukesh also get attracted to each other and get married. Archana's mother does not like Sukesh due to his modest income. She makes up stories about their affluence, which offends Sukesh. She interferes in their life and buys things for them. It bruises his ego. All these things result in acrimony between Archana and Sukesh, and they decide to separate. Archana goes to live with her parents, while Sukesh relocates. Archana's family asks her to forget Sukesh, and remarry, which Archana finds difficult since she still has feelings for Sukesh. She goes to a far off place to work as teacher to find solace. One day Sukesh and Archana meet in a railway waiting room by chance. There they resolve their misunderstandings and grievances. They reunite to live happily thereafter.

Cast
 Vijay Anand as Professor Sukesh Dutt
 Jaya Bachchan as Archana Gupta
 A. K. Hangal as Principal Gupta
 Achala Sachdev as Mrs. Gupta
 Nazneen as Aruna Gupta
 Dinesh Hingoo as Govind Gupta
 Deven Verma as Drona Acharya
 Ramesh Deo as Archana's Uncle
 Seema Deo as Archana's Aunt
 Sulochana Latkar as Sukesh's Aunt
 Arvind Rathod as Basuda (servant)
 Master Shahid as Deepak

Music
All lyrics written by M. G. Hashmat.
The song "Mera Jeevan Kora Kagaz" topped the Binaca Geetmala annual list 1974

Awards and nominations
National Film Awards:
 Best Popular Film Providing Wholesome Entertainment – Anil Ganguly
Best Female Playback Singer – Lata Mangeshkar for "Roothe Roothe Piya"
22nd Filmfare Awards:

Won

 Best Actress – Jaya Bachchan
 Best Music Director – Kalyanji-Anandji

Nominated 
Best Film – Sanat Kothari
Best Director – Anil Ganguly
Best Story – Ashutosh Mukhopadhyay
Best Lyricist – M. G. Hashmat for "Mera Jeevan Kora Kagaz"
 Best Male Playback Singer – Kishore Kumar for "Mera Jeevan Kora Kagaz"
BFJA Awards:
Kalyanji Anandji – Best Music Directors in Hindi film section
M.G.Hashmat – Best Lyricist in Hindi film section
Lata Mangeshkar – Best Female Playback Singer in Hindi film section
Kishore Kumar – Best Male Playback Singer in Hindi film section

References

External links 
 

1974 films
Indian drama films
1970s Hindi-language films
Films scored by Kalyanji Anandji
Films set in Mumbai
Hindi remakes of Bengali films
Best Popular Film Providing Wholesome Entertainment National Film Award winners
Films directed by Anil Ganguly
1974 drama films
Hindi-language drama films
Films based on works by Ashutosh Mukhopadhyay